Clifford railway station was a station in Clifford, Herefordshire, England. The station was opened in 1881, closed to passengers in 1941 and closed completely in 1950.

References

Further reading

Disused railway stations in Herefordshire
Railway stations in Great Britain opened in 1881
Railway stations in Great Britain closed in 1950
1881 establishments in England
1950 disestablishments in England
Former Great Western Railway stations